The Proposal is a 2009 American romantic comedy film directed by Anne Fletcher and written by Peter Chiarelli. It is produced by Kurtzman/Orci Productions, Mandeville Films and Touchstone Pictures for Walt Disney Studios Motion Pictures, and stars Sandra Bullock and Ryan Reynolds with Malin Åkerman, Craig T. Nelson, Mary Steenburgen and Betty White in supporting roles. The plot centers on a Canadian executive who learns that she may face deportation from the U.S. because her visa renewal application was denied. Determined to retain her position as editor-in-chief of a publishing house, she convinces her long-suffering personal assistant to temporarily act as her fiancé.

Development began in 2005, when Chiarelli wrote the script. Principal filming occurred over a period of two months from March to May 2008. The film received mixed-to-positive reviews from critics, who   praised the performances and chemistry between Bullock and Reynolds, but criticized its screenplay and what was seen as a formulaic plot structure. It was a box office success, grossing over $317 million worldwide on its $40 million budget. Bullock was nominated for the Golden Globe Award for Best Actress – Motion Picture Comedy or Musical.

Plot
Margaret Tate is a Canadian executive editor-in-chief of a New York book publishing company. Due to her pushy personality, she is disliked by her employees. Margaret learns from her superior Chairman Bergen that her visa renewal application has been denied due to visa term violation and she faces deportation back to Canada. Not wanting to lose her position and life in New York, she blackmails her long-suffering personal assistant Andrew Paxton into marrying her so she can get a green card. She reminds Andrew that if she is deported, the work he put in as her assistant will be lost, which will set back his dream to become an editor.

U.S. immigration agent Gilbertson informs them that he suspects they are committing fraud to avoid Margaret's deportation. Gilbertson tells them that they will be asked questions about each other separately. If their answers do not match, Margaret will be deported to Canada permanently and Andrew will be convicted of a felony punishable by a $250,000 fine and five years in prison. Andrew insists that Margaret make him an editor after their marriage and publish the book he has been recommending to her. Margaret is forced to agree.

The couple travels to Sitka, Alaska, Andrew's hometown, to meet his family. Margaret meets Andrew's mother Grace and grandmother Annie, known as "Gammy". During the trip to the family home, Margaret notices that nearly every shop in town carries the name Paxton and learns that Andrew's family is in fact very wealthy. During a welcome home party, Andrew confronts his father Joe, who is angry about Andrew dating the boss he has so long disliked and believes he is using her to get ahead in his career. After their argument, Andrew announces the engagement to everyone. Margaret also meets Gertrude, Andrew's ex-girlfriend. At the party, they invent the story of how Andrew proposed to Margaret.

The next day, Grace and Annie take Margaret to a local bar as part of her bachelorette party to watch a strip dance by locally famous but over-the-hill exotic dancer Ramone. Stepping away from the show, Margaret learns from Gertrude that Andrew wanted to become an editor and make his own life and that Andrew had proposed to Gertrude. However, Gertrude refused because she did not want to leave Sitka for New York. Margaret also learns of the conflict between Andrew and Joe. That night, Margaret asks Andrew about his relationship with his father, but Andrew refuses to talk. Instead, Margaret opens up to him.

The next day, the family convinces them to marry while they're in Sitka. Margaret realizes how close and real Andrew's family is, and this moves her deeply especially because of the deception. She gets on Andrew's boat, and speeds away with him. She admits she has been alone since she was sixteen years old after her parents died, and had forgotten what it felt like to have a family. She lets go of the helm and stumbles to the back of the boat. Andrew makes a sharp turn to avoid hitting a buoy and Margaret falls out of the boat. Andrew quickly turns the boat around and saves her because she cannot swim. Meanwhile, suspicious Gilbertson has turned up in Sitka ready to charge Andrew with fraud. At the wedding, Margaret stops the ceremony by confessing the truth to the guests and Gilbertson. Gilbertson informs her she has 24 hours to leave for Canada.

Margaret returns to the Paxton home to pack her things. Andrew rushes to their room only to find Margaret has already left, leaving his book manuscript with a note of praise and a promise to publish it. Gertrude attempts to comfort Andrew and asks if he is going to go after her. As he rushes out to find Margaret, another argument arises between him and Joe. Annie suddenly shows symptoms of a heart attack, causing her and the family to be airlifted to the hospital and convinces them to reconcile before she "passes away". After she succeeds in getting things moving again, she admits to faking the heart attack as it was the only means to get their attention, and tells the pilot to head to the airport in hopes of catching up to Margaret.

Andrew's parents realize he really loves Margaret. He returns to New York and tells Margaret he loves her in front of the entire office staff. After they kiss, they go to Gilbertson and inform him that they are again engaged but for real this time.

During the credits, Gilbertson questions Margaret, Andrew, Andrew's family, and Ramone. Each of the answers proves Gilbertson right about them.

Cast
 Sandra Bullock as Margaret Tate, a pushy editor-in-chief at a major New York City book publisher. 
 Ryan Reynolds as Andrew Paxton, Margaret's assistant whose ultimate career goal is to become an editor.
 Malin Åkerman as Gertrude, Andrew's ex-girlfriend.
 Craig T. Nelson as Joe Paxton, Andrew's father who owns the family businesses that dominate the entire town of Sitka.
 Mary Steenburgen as Grace Paxton, Andrew's mother.
 Betty White as Grandma Annie, Andrew's grandmother and Joe's mother.
 Oscar Nunez as Ramone, a jack of all trades resident of Sitka who holds many jobs including waiter, male stripper, shopkeeper and minister.
 Denis O'Hare as Mr. Gilbertson, the immigration agent investigating Margaret's case.
 Michael Nouri as Chairman Bergen, Tate's superior who is the chairman of the board of directors.
 Aasif Mandvi as Bob Spaulding, a fired editor who Tate's superiors plan to rehire if Tate gets deported since he is the only one to match her skills.
 Michael Mosley as Chuck, Andrew's friend.

Production

Peter Chiarelli wrote the script for the film in 2005. In May 2007, it was announced that Sandra Bullock had been given a lead role for The Proposal. Julia Roberts was originally approached for the lead, but declined. Nearly two months later, it was reported that plans were being finalized for Ryan Reynolds to star opposite Bullock. In January 2008, Touchstone Pictures signed Anne Fletcher to direct. The film premiered on June 1, 2009, at the El Capitan Theatre in Hollywood, California.

Shooting for The Proposal began on April 2, 2008 in Rockport, Massachusetts. In the days leading up to production, part of the town was remodeled to simulate Sitka, Alaska, the primary setting. Principal photography began on April 9 at Bearskin Neck, and continued for 24 hours. Filming resumed at the Motif Number One building on Bradley Wharf (April 14–16), the Haskins Building (April 15–18), and the central business district of Rockport (April 17). Principal photography relocated to Manchester-by-the-Sea, Massachusetts on April 22, for approximately two weeks. City officials accommodated the producers by renting out all their parking lots. Filming for The Proposal was delayed  briefly when Bullock and her husband were involved in a car accident. The wedding scene was filmed in a three-story twentieth century Victorian home; photography at the residence lasted three weeks. In an interview with The New York Times, the homeowners stated that Nelson Coates knocked on their door asking for leaves. The owners directed Coates to other residences, but eventually gave the producer a tour of the house. Production occurred on the first floor of the home. Outside of the Cape Ann area, filming took place in Boston, Massachusetts, at the State Street Bank Building and in Lower Manhattan in New York City. The Proposal contained 350 special effect shots, with some parts edited using computer-generated imagery. The score for The Proposal was composed by Aaron Zigman, who recorded it with the Hollywood Studio Symphony at the Sony Scoring Stage.

As part of an extensive advertising campaign, Reynolds discussed his participation in a nude scene. Expressing that she had been initially nervous, Bullock stated in an interview with Sky News that "when everyone else acts like it's just a normal day it really helps you relax." Although she said that producers had provided them with fig leaves, Bullock stated that they would continuously fall off. She added, "You could literally see everything." Similar sentiments were expressed by Reynolds, who in an interview with People, stated, "Filming a scene that involves being entirely naked and takes a couple days can be a little awkward." He continued: "Thankfully you're there for so long and you're doing it for so long that you dispense with the awkwardness pretty quickly and start to have mundane, normal conversations – the difference being you're not wearing pants."

Release

Box office
The Proposal was released in the United States on June 19, 2009. On its opening day, the film grossed an estimated $12.7 million in 3,056 theaters, becoming the highest-grossing film of the day. It later went on to gross over $34 million during its opening weekend, beating out Year One, Up, and The Hangover. In an exit poll conducted by Disney, nearly 63% of the opening audience consisted of female viewers, 78% were eighteen or older, and 71% were classified as couples. It marked the biggest opening weekend out of any film in Bullock's career, nearly doubling her previous holder, Premonition. As of October 2011, the film had grossed over $164 million in the United States and Canada.

Box office performances showed similar numbers in international markets. The film was released in Australia on June 18, 2009, grossing over $2.8 million on its opening weekend. In Russia, the film grossed over $2.6 million on its opening weekend, accounting for 34% of all total film revenue in that country. In South Africa the film debuted at number two, losing out to the new release Ice Age: Dawn of the Dinosaurs. It managed to gross over $2.6 million as of October 2011. In the United Kingdom, estimated first opening weekend grosses stand at £3.2 million. The film has grossed over $317 million worldwide, with international grosses standing at $153 million. It is the twentieth highest-grossing film of 2009.

Critical reception

On review aggregation website Rotten Tomatoes, the film has an approval rating of 45% based on 187 reviews, with an average rating of 5.32/10. The site's critical consensus reads: "Sandra Bullock and Ryan Reynolds exhibit plenty of chemistry, but they're let down by The Proposal devotion to formula." On Metacritic, which assigns a weighted average rating, the film has a score of 48 out of 100, based on 30 reviews from critics, indicating "mixed or average reviews". Audiences polled by CinemaScore gave the film an average grade of "A−" on an A+ to F scale.

Roger Ebert of the Chicago Sun-Times offered a mixed review, giving the film three out of four stars despite complaining that the film "recycles a plot that was already old when Tracy and Hepburn were trying it out" but adding he was eventually won over by the performances. Peter Travers of Rolling Stone was very critical of the film, calling it insipid. He wrote, "Anne Fletcher directs Peter Chiarelli's script like a manufacturer of hard plastic that is guaranteed to ward off intrusion from all recognizable human emotion." New York Times writer Manohla Dargis felt that Bullock's character was awkward in comparison to her previous work. She continued: "She’s always been better in fundamentally independent roles that allow her to grab the wheel [...] and take the spotlight [...], an independence that persists all the way through the last-act coupling. She can smile as brightly at a man as well as the next leading lady, though, like all genuinely big female stars, she’s really more of a solo act." The Telegraph Tim Robey expressed disappointment towards the film, giving it a two out of five stars.

The interaction between Bullock and Reynolds was well received by critics. Lisa Schwarzbaum of Entertainment Weekly opined that the chemistry between the two actors was "fresh and irresistible." Zorianna Kit of The Huffington Post exclaimed that "what [kept] audiences of this lite-fare comedy in their seats is the undeniable on-screen chemistry between leads Sandra Bullock and Ryan Reynolds." She continued: "The two are so adept at comedy and have so much fun with one another, viewers watching The Proposal won't be able to resist their charms, even when some of the plot veers in to unnecessarily silliness." Betsey Sharkley of the Los Angeles Times felt that their relationship was a "cheeky update of The Taming of the Shrew." She opined, "Bullock's deft physical comedy, one of her most endearing qualities, is given a full run. [...] Reynolds' ability to deliver a line, or a look, with withering, surgical precision is there at every turn." Giving it a one out of five stars, The Guardian writer Peter Bradshaw gave a negative reaction to the interaction between Bullock and Reynolds. Bradshaw stated: "Their initial sparky detestation isn't convincing, and neither is their later thawing and romance. In each scene, it looks as if they have never met before. And Margaret isn't permitted to be a convincing cow, because that would make her unsympathetic [...]. Andrew can't be a total wimp, because that would be unsexy, so the fundamental comic premises of the film are fudged."

Accolades

Home media
The Proposal was released by Touchstone Home Entertainment on DVD and Blu-ray on October 13, 2009. It sold over 2.4 million units within its first week, translating to an addition of $39.3 million in the box office. In its second week, sales numbers declined by 70% to 623,744 units, ranking second among DVD sales of the week. By July 2013, The Proposal had sold over 5.6 million units and earned over $90 million in sales.

Remakes

Indian remakes
 It is loosely remade into Malayalam titled My Boss (2012).
 The Kannada remake is titled as Software Ganda (2014).
 The Tamil remake titled as Sandakkari (2021).

Chinese remake
 A Chinese remake co-produced by Walt Disney Pictures and Linmon Pictures, and directed by Yee Chin-yen was announced in June 2016.

Other languages 
 The Iranian remake is titled as To va man (2011).

References

External links

 
 
 
 
 
 

2009 romantic comedy films
2009 films
American romantic comedy films
2000s English-language films
Films about immigration to the United States
Films about weddings
Films directed by Anne Fletcher
Films scored by Aaron Zigman
Films set in Alaska
Films shot in Massachusetts
Films shot in Boston
Films shot in New York City
Films shot in Los Angeles
Touchstone Pictures films
Mandeville Films films
Sham marriage
Films produced by David Hoberman
Films produced by Todd Lieberman
2000s American films